Brujas is a 1996 Spanish comedy-drama film written and directed by Álvaro Fernández Armero and starring Penélope Cruz, Neus Asensi, Ana Álvarez, Álex Angulo, and Beatriz Carvajal.

Cast

See also 
 List of Spanish films of 1996

References

External links
 

1990s Spanish films
1990s Spanish-language films
1996 comedy-drama films
Spanish comedy-drama films
Enrique Cerezo PC films